Jonas Lantto (born May 22, 1987) is a Swedish footballer who plays as a winger for FK Karlskrona.

Career
He joined Gefle IF in 2007 after a standout season in Kiruna FF where he was named footballer of the year in Norrbotten. Lantto left Gefle at the end of 2018.

On 2 March 2019, Lantto joined FK Karlskrona.

References

External links

Jonas Lantto at Fotbolltransfers
Jonas Lantto at FK Karlskrona's website

1987 births
Living people
Swedish footballers
Sweden under-21 international footballers
Sweden youth international footballers
Association football midfielders
Allsvenskan players
Superettan players
Gefle IF players
FK Karlskrona players